The 52nd Guldbagge Awards ceremony, presented by the Swedish Film Institute, honoring the best Swedish films of 2016 and took place on January 23, 2017 at Cirkus in Stockholm. The ceremony was televised by SVT, and comedian Petra Mede hosted the ceremony for the fifth time. She previously hosted the 46th, 47th, 50th, and 51st ceremonies. The nominees were presented on January 4, 2017.

This year, the following categories has been expanded to four nominees: Best Director, Best Screenplay, Best Actress, Best Actor, Supporting Actress and Supporting Actor, while the category of Best Film has been expanded to five. In addition to this changes, the documentary - and short film juries have been combined, and also introduced new rules, which requires the distributors of foreign films to register their films, in order to be eligible for a Guldbagge.

Winners and nominees 
The nominees for the 52nd Guldbagge Awards were announced on 4 January 2017 in Stockholm, by the Swedish Film Institute.

Awards 

Winners are listed first and highlighted in '''boldface.

Presenters 
The following individuals are confirmed to present awards at the ceremony.

 Alice Bah Kuhnke
 Bea Szenfeld
 Bianca Kronlöf
 Björn Kjellman
 Börje Ahlstedt
 Can Demirtas
 Christian Svensson
 Christina Schollin
 Claes Ljungmark
 Clara Henry and Thomas Sekelius
 Erik Hassle
 Ester Vuori and Leo Hellenius
 Dragomir Mrsic
 Gert Wingårdhs
 Haddy Jallow
 Hanna Alström
 Jason Diakité
 Josefin Asplund
 Lena Endre
 Malin Levanon
 Maria Kulle
 Maxida Märak
 Michael Segerström
 Roy Fares
 Sofia Ledarp
 Steve Angello

See also 
 89th Academy Awards
 74th Golden Globe Awards
 70th British Academy Film Awards
 23rd Screen Actors Guild Awards
 22nd Critics' Choice Awards
 21st Satellite Awards
 37th Golden Raspberry Awards

References

External links 
 
Guldbaggen on Facebook
Guldbaggen on Twitter
52nd Guldbagge Awards at Internet Movie Database

2017 in Swedish cinema
2016 film awards
Guldbagge Awards ceremonies
2010s in Stockholm
January 2017 events in Europe